Mario Martone (born 20 November 1959) is an Italian film director and screenwriter. He has directed more than 30 films since 1985. His film L'amore molesto was entered into the 1995 Cannes Film Festival. His 2010 film Noi credevamo competed for the Golden Lion at the 67th Venice International Film Festival. He was also the stage director for Lorenzo Ferrero's opera Charlotte Corday, which was premiered at Teatro dell'Opera di Roma on 21 February 1989.

His 2014 film Leopardi has been selected to compete for the Golden Lion at the 71st Venice International Film Festival.

Filmography
 Perfidi incanti (1985)
 Nella città barocca (1985)
 Morte di un matematico napoletano (1992)
 Rasoi (1993)
 Miracoli, storie per corti (1994)
 L'unico paese al mondo (1994)
 L'amore molesto (1995)
 Una storia Saharawi (1996)
 I vesuviani (1997)
 La terra trema (1998)
 Teatro di guerra (1998)
 Lulu (2001)
 L'odore del sangue (2004)
 Caravaggio, l'ultimo tempo (2005)
 Noi credevamo (2010)
 Leopardi (2014)
 Capri-Revolution (2018)
 The Mayor of Rione Sanità (2019)
 Qui rido io (2021)
 Nostalgia (2022)
 Massimo Troisi: Somebody Down There Likes Me (2023)

References

External links

1959 births
Living people
Italian film directors
Italian screenwriters
Italian male screenwriters
David di Donatello winners
Nastro d'Argento winners
Ciak d'oro winners